Shimanovsk Airport is an airport in Russia located 4 km southwest of Shimanovsk, Amur Oblast. It primarily services general aviation and is a minor facility.

References
RussianAirFields.com

 Airports built in the Soviet Union
 Airports in Amur Oblast